The Legend of Johnny Cash is a single-disc compilation album of American musician and singer Johnny Cash's career. It is the first such album to contain material from Cash's American Recordings era in addition to songs from his time at Sun and Columbia, as well as one track recorded for Island Records. It was released on October 25, 2005, on the Island/American/Columbia/Legacy record labels and tied to the release of the Cash biopic Walk the Line. In the wake of that film's success its sales made the compilation an overwhelming success. The album was certified Gold on December 7, 2005, Platinum on December 14, 2005, and 2× Platinum on May 19, 2006, by the RIAA. As of November 2017, the album has sold 3,866,300 copies in the United States.

A UK version entitled Ring of Fire: The Legend of Johnny Cash has a different track listing.

Track listing

Alternate UK track listing
A version released in the UK entitled Ring of Fire: The Legend of Johnny Cash has a slightly altered track listing, with some of the above songs absent and others, such as covers of U2's "One" and Depeche Mode's "Personal Jesus", included in their place.

Personnel
 Johnny Cash – vocals, guitar, harmonica, piano, production

Additional personnel
 Rick Rubin, Steven Berkowitz, Charlie Bragg, Gregg Geller, Bob Johnston, Frank Jones, Don Law, Andy McKaie, Chips Moman – production 
 Gavin Lurssen, Dana Smart – remastering
 Adam Abrams – production coordination
 Tom Jermann/t42design – design
 David Gahr, Don Hunstein, Les Leverett, Jim Marshall, Alan Messer – photography
 Ryan Null – photo coordination
 Adam Starr – product manager
 Rich Kienzle – liner notes. * Compilation produced by Rick Rubin. * Engineered by David Ferguson

Charts and certifications

Weekly charts

Year-end charts

Certifications

References

External links
 Johnny Cash’s official website

2005 compilation albums
Blues compilation albums
Folk compilation albums
Gospel compilation albums
Country music compilation albums
Rock compilation albums
Johnny Cash compilation albums
Columbia Records compilation albums
Legacy Recordings compilation albums
Canadian Country Music Association Top Selling Album albums